Royal Air Force Brunton or more simply RAF Brunton is a former Royal Air Force satellite airfield located in Northumberland, England.

The following units were here at some point:
 Satellite for No. 56 Operational Training Unit RAF (December 1944 - May 1945)
 Satellite for No. 59 OTU (August 1942 - January 1944)
 No. 2772 Squadron RAF Regiment
 No. 2879 Squadron RAF Regiment
 Fighter Leaders School RAF (1944)

References

Citations

Bibliography

B